Dan Jones (born 7 January 1996) is a Welsh rugby union player who plays for Scarlets regional team as a fly half.

Jones made his debut for the Scarlets regional team in 2015 having previously played for the Scarlets academy and Carmarthen Quins.

References

External links 
Scarlets Player Profile

1996 births
Living people
Rugby union players from Carmarthen
Scarlets players
Welsh rugby union players
Rugby union fly-halves